Great apes are apes in the family Hominidae.

Great apes may also refer to:

 Great Apes (novel), a novel by Will Self
 Pongidae, or "great apes", an obsolete taxonomic family